Meadowlands or The Meadowlands may refer to:

Places

United States

Minnesota
Meadowlands, Minnesota, a city in Minnesota
Meadowlands Township, St. Louis County, Minnesota, a township in Minnesota

New Jersey
Meadowlands Rail Line, a New Jersey Transit rail line
New Jersey Meadowlands, the name for a wetlands and its surrounding area in northeast New Jersey, United States
New Jersey Meadowlands District

Elsewhere
Meadowlands, Gauteng, a suburb of Johannesburg, South Africa
Meadowlands, Hamilton, Ontario, a neighborhood in Canada

Arts, entertainment, and media

Music
The Meadowlands (album), a 2003 album by The Wrens
"Polyushko Pole", Russian song also known as "Meadowland"
Meadowlands (song), South African song about apartheid

Television
Meadowlands (TV series), a British television series also known as Cape Wrath
"Meadowlands" (The Sopranos episode), an episode of the television series The Sopranos

Other arts, entertainment, and media
Meadowland (film), a 2015 American drama film 
Meadowlands (book), a 1997 poetry book by Louise Glück

Enterprises and organizations
Meadowlands Environment Center, an educational facility in Minnesota
Meadowlands Sports Complex in East Rutherford, New Jersey, named for the wetlands, which consists of:
Meadowlands (NJT station)
American Dream Meadowlands, a proposed retail center and entertainment complex
Meadowlands Arena
Meadowlands Racetrack
MetLife Stadium, the new Giants and Jets Stadium that replaced the since demolished Giants Stadium 
New Jersey Meadowlands Commission, regulatory agency that manages the New Jersey Meadowlands

Other uses
Meadowlands Grand Prix, a CART series race held in New Jersey